Velika Varnica is a settlement in the Haloze Hills in eastern Slovenia. It lies on the border with Croatia in the Municipality of Videm. The area traditionally belonged to the Styria region. It is now included in the Drava Statistical Region.

There are two churches on a hill to the south of the settlement, right on the Croatian border. One is dedicated to Saint Augustine and the other to Mary Magdalene. Both were built in the early 19th century.

References

External links
Velika Varnica on Geopedia

Populated places in the Municipality of Videm